Nagaland Page is a daily English newspaper published from Dimapur in the India state of Nagaland. It was founded in 1999 and edited and published by Monalisa Changkija.

See also
List of newspapers in Nagaland

References

External links
Official Website
Nagaland Page on Instagram

Newspapers published in Nagaland
English-language newspapers published in India
1999 establishments in Nagaland
Publications established in 1999
Mass media in Nagaland
Dimapur